The Army Base Repair Organisation (ABRO) was an executive agency which reported to the United Kingdom's Ministry of Defence. It provided engineering, repair and re-manufacturing services to the British Armed Forces and also to the police and some local councils. ABRO traced its history back to the foundation of the Corps of Armourers in 1858.

History
On 1 April 1993, the Army's static workshops in Great Britain, previously under the control of the Equipment Support Organisation, were reorganised as the Army Base Repair Organisation. It comprised the headquarters at Andover, a contract repair branch and a network of base and district workshops. It employed 3,581 civilian workers and 219 military staff.

Apart from the HQ at Andover, there were other major units at Bovington, Old Dalby, Leics, Catterick, Colchester, Donnington, Stirling and Warminster.  Smaller sites were located at Bicester, Edinburgh, Sennybridge and York.

On 1 April 2002, the Army Base Repair Organisation was established as a trading fund under the name ABRO.

Its services included:
 Maintenance, repair and overhaul
 Complex service and repair
 Assembly, integration and test
 Calibration
 Diagnostics
 Fleet management
 Mobile support teams
 Obsolescence management
 Re-manufacture
 Workshop management

ABRO's annual turnover was typically in excess of £147 million and each year carried out work on over 1,000 product lines of military and commercial vehicles and equipment, as well as over 55,000 ad hoc repair tasks.

On 22 May 2007, it was announced by the Minister of State for Defence Equipment and Support, Lord Drayson, that ABRO would be merged with DARA, the Defence Aviation Repair Agency to become the Defence Support Group with effect from 1 April 2008.

References

External links
Official ABRO site

Defunct executive agencies of the United Kingdom government
History of the British Army
Military in Hampshire
Defence agencies of the United Kingdom
Organisations based in Hampshire
Test Valley
St Athan